Antoine Graves may refer to:
Antoine Graves (building) a senior citizen highrise in Atlanta, Georgia demolished in 2009
Antoine Graves (person) (1862–1941), black realtor and educator in Atlanta, Georgia